G-Side is an American hip hop duo from Huntsville, Alabama. The group consists of ST 2 Lettaz (born Stephen Harris) and Yung Clova (born David Williams).

History
ST 2 Lettaz and Yung Clova first met at the Boys & Girls Club in Athens, Alabama. In 1999, they formed G-Side. The duo connected with the production team Block Beattaz and got involved in the entertainment company Slow Motion Soundz.

G-Side's debut studio album, Sumthin 2 Hate, was released in 2007. It was followed by Starshipz and Rocketz (2008) and Huntsville International (2009). In 2011, the duo released The One...Cohesive, as well as Island.

In September 2012, it was announced that they had decided to part ways. However, their hiatus ended in November 2013.

The duo released Gz II Godz in 2014 and The 2 Cohesive in 2018.

Style and influences 
In a 2010 interview, G-Side cited 8Ball & MJG, Outkast, Ghetto Mafia, Geto Boys, Master P, and UGK as the influences on the duo's music.

Discography

Studio albums
 Sumthin 2 Hate (2007)
 Starshipz and Rocketz (2008)
 Huntsville International (2009)
 The One...Cohesive (2011)
 Island (2011)
 Gz II Godz (2014)
 The 2 Cohesive (2018)

Live albums
 Live from the Parish (2010)

Singles
 "Relaxin'" (2010)
 "The Blackout" (2011)
 "Forever" (2013)

Guest appearances
 Lars Vaular - "Klokken fem om natten" from Helt om natten, helt om dagen (2010)
 Sinden - "G Like Me" (2011)
 Stevie Joe - "Bass" from 21.0 Grams (2011)

References

External links
 
 

American musical duos
Hip hop duos
American hip hop groups
Musical groups from Alabama
Musical groups established in 1999
1999 establishments in Alabama